Together Alone is the debut studio album released by Dutch singer Anouk. It was highly successful in the Netherlands and featured three top 30 singles: "Nobody's Wife", "It's So Hard" and "Sacrifice". The album was produced by Barry Hay and George Kooymans from the Dutch rock band Golden Earring.

The rare collectors item (EAN code 8712195760974) includes a second disc with "Nobody's Wife" remixed, and videos for "Nobody's Wife" and "Sacrifice".

Track listing
"Nobody's Wife"
"Together Alone"
"It's So Hard"
"The Other Side of Me"
"Pictures on Your Skin"
"Sacrifice"
"Fluid Conduction"
"My Life"
"It's a Shame"
"Time Is a Jailer"
"Mood Indigo"

Musical credits
Tren van Enckevort - accordion
Pim Koopman - string arrangement
Michel van Schie - bass guitar
Hans Eijkenaar - drums
Satindra Kalpoe - drums on "Mood Indigo"
Lex Bolderdijk - guitar
John Legrand - harmonica
Eddy Conard - percussion
Nico Brandsen - keyboards
Frank Carillo - guitar
George Kooymans - backing vocals, guitar
Barry Hay - backing vocals
Carlos Lake - bass guitar on "Mood Indigo"

Staff
John Sonneveld - sound engineer, production
Sander van der Heide - mastering
Frans Jansen - photography
Peters & Moest'l - graphics
Barry Hay - production
George Kooymans - production

Certifications

References

Anouk (singer) albums
1997 debut albums